Robert D. Foster (14 March 1811 – 1 February 1878) was a 19th-century physician and an early member of the Latter Day Saint movement, being baptized into the Church of Christ (later renamed the Church of Jesus Christ of Latter-day Saints) sometime before October 1839.

Early life
Foster was born in Braunston, England on March 14, 1811. He was the son of John Foster and Jane Knibb. He was the brother of Charles A. Foster. Foster married Sarah Phinney on July 18, 1837 at Medina County, Ohio. He and Phinney had two children: a son and a daughter. Foster was baptized into the Church of Christ, and, in October 1839, he was ordained to be an elder of the church while living in Nauvoo, Illinois.

Latter Day Saint movement
After joining the church, Foster accompanied Joseph Smith, the founder of the Latter Day Saint movement, to Washington, D.C. in March 1840 to help "draft Senate Committee reports" on the Missouri redress issue. Foster was then mentioned by name in a revelation dated January 19, 1841, in which Joseph Smith states that Foster should build Smith a house in Nauvoo:

Foster helped build and purchased stock in the resulting Mansion House.

Foster was appointed surgeon general in the Nauvoo Legion in March 1841 and he was a Regent of the University of Nauvoo from 1841 to 1844. He was also involved in the Nauvoo Masonic Lodge and the Nauvoo Agricultural and Manufacturing Association. Foster also served as Hancock County Magistrate. 

In April 1843, Foster traveled to Tioga County, New York to serve a mission. However, after his return, he began to gamble and speak out against the church. Foster was excommunicated from the church on 18 April 1844, in Nauvoo for "immorality and apostacy" after Joseph Smith charged Foster with character defamation, lying, and endangering his life in the Nauvoo High Council. He was subsequently released from his position in the Nauvoo Legion.

Nauvoo Expositor and death of Joseph Smith

After his excommunication, Foster became a publisher of the Nauvoo Expositor, which was critical of the church and Smith. Foster helped write the June 7, 1844 issue of the newspaper that led Smith to order the destruction of the press, leading to Smith's arrest and ultimately to his death. Foster had previously joined discussions in which the murder of Joseph Smith was planned, but never saw these efforts through himself. After Joseph and Hyrum Smith were shot and killed at Carthage Jail, Foster was  "charged and acquitted of their murder." In a conversation with Abraham Hodge, Foster expressed regret at having played a hand in Joseph's and Hyrum's deaths.

Additionally, there is evidence that Smith may have propositioned Foster's wife to become one of Smith's plural wives, but was turned down. Foster's wife denied this claim multiple times, and only admitted it when he held a gun to her head.

Foster was an apostle in the church formed by First Presidency member William Law.

Later life
In 1850, Foster moved to Canandaigua, New York and worked there as a physician. In 1860, he moved to Loda, Illinois, where he died on February 1, 1878. He was 67 years old.

References

External links 

 Robert D. Foster legal documents, L. Tom Perry Special Collections, Harold B. Lee Library, Brigham Young University
 Robert D. Foster affidavit, L. Tom Perry Special Collections, Harold B. Lee Library, Brigham Young University
 Hancock County (Ill.) court summons (signed by Robert D. Foster acting as Justice of the Peace), L. Tom Perry Special Collections, Harold B. Lee Library, Brigham Young University

1811 births
1878 deaths
19th-century American journalists
19th-century English medical doctors
American Latter Day Saints
American male journalists
British Latter Day Saints
Converts to Mormonism
Doctrine and Covenants people
English Latter Day Saints
English emigrants to the United States
Nauvoo Expositor publishers
People excommunicated by the Church of Christ (Latter Day Saints)
People from Braunston
People from Iroquois County, Illinois
People from Nauvoo, Illinois
Harold B. Lee Library-related 19th century articles